Marieve Herington (born February 22, 1988) is a Canadian actress and singer who has appeared in recurring roles on How I Met Your Mother, Good Luck Charlie and Ever After High. She provides the voice of Tilly Green on the Disney Channel show Big City Greens as well as voicing animated lead characters in Delilah & Julius and Pearlie. In addition to that, she voiced Celestia Ludenburg in the popular anime video game Danganronpa: Trigger Happy Havoc. At the age of 12, she began singing in major public performances. Since the age of 16, she has been fronting her own jazz ensembles. Currently, she performs with the Marieve Herington Band.

Early life and career 

Herington is a native of Oakville, Ontario, Canada, where she attended St. Mildred's-Lightbourn School. She studied drama at the University of Toronto.

Appearing in a series of Canadian Tire and KFC commercials, she joined the Alliance of Canadian Cinema, Television and Radio Artists (ACTRA) at the age of 9.

Her first jazz group, Marieve and her Midnight Blues, played the annual Downtown Oakville Jazz Festival, Oakville Waterfront Festival, restaurants, and other local events. Her first album, Blossoming, published under her own label Maribelle Records, was made available on the Timely Manor label distributed through Fontana North/Universal. She performed on the Toronto jazz circuit with Babes in Jazzland and members of The Royal Jelly Orchestra, appearing on two more albums.

She sang the theme songs for CBC Television's Sesame Park, Nelvana's Pippi Longstocking and TVOntario's Marigold's Mathemagics.

Herington moved to Los Angeles in 2008. The Marieve Herington Band performs in southern California and Toronto. Their latest album is Midnight Sessions.

Filmography

Animation

Anime

Films

Video games

Live-action

Discography
Blossoming (Timely Manor, 2006)
Midnight Sessions (2010)

References

External links
 
 
 MarieveHerington.com
 Marieve Herington Facebook
 
 

1988 births
Living people
21st-century American women
21st-century Canadian actresses
21st-century Canadian women singers
Actresses from Los Angeles
Actresses from Ontario
Canadian child actresses
Canadian emigrants to the United States
Canadian film actresses
Canadian television actresses
Canadian video game actresses
Canadian voice actresses
Canadian women jazz singers
Franco-Ontarian people
Jazz musicians from California
People from Oakville, Ontario
Singers from Los Angeles
University of Toronto alumni